Cop Squad is a British documentary reality show that was broadcast on Sky1 from 6 June to 8 August 2011 and replaced Brit Cops. (It is considered to be the same show). It follows the Cambridgeshire Police.

External links

2010s British reality television series
2011 British television series debuts
2011 British television series endings
British crime television series
Documentary television series about policing
English-language television shows
Sky UK original programming
Television shows set in Cambridgeshire